The Suzuki JR50 is a miniature motorcycle with a  displacement and a single-speed automatic transmission, using a centrifugal clutch and height adjustable suspension. An oil injected two-stroke engine provides optimum lubrication and an oil level window makes it easy to see when a refill is needed. It is designed for children ages 5 to 12, and has been used for both racing and recreational riding. The JR50's engine was later used in the ALT50 and LT50 ATV's.

References

Off-road motorcycles
Minibikes
JR50
Two-stroke motorcycles